In the 19th and early 20th century, these were the treaty ports in China.

I. Northern ports

II. Yangtze River ports

III. Central ports

IV. South Coast ports

V. Frontier ports 

According to the customs statistics, 6,917,000 Chinese inhabited the treaty ports in 1906. The foreign population included 1837 firms and 38,597 persons, mainly Europeans (British 9356, French 2189, German 1939, Portuguese 3184, Italians 786, Spaniards 389, Belgians 297, Austrians 236, Russians 273, Danes 209, Dutch 225, Norwegians 185, Swedes 135), Americans 3447, Brazilians 16, Japanese 15,548, Koreans 47, subjects of non-treaty powers 236.

See also 

 Unequal treaty
 Concessions in China
 Century of humiliation
 Sick man of Asia

References

Further reading
 Bracken, Gregory. "Treaty Ports in China: Their Genesis, Development, and Influence." Journal of Urban History (2019), Vol. 45 Issue 1, pp 168-176. online
 Nield, Robert. "The China Coast: Trade and the First Treaty Ports". Hong Kong: Joint Publishing Co, 2010

History of European colonialism

Chinese treaty ports